Summer Fruit is a 1929 omnibus volume by the English author Dornford Yates (Cecil William Mercer) containing the two novels Anthony Lyveden (1921) and Valerie French (1923). It was published by Minton, Balch & Company of New York. No similar omnibus volume was published in the UK.

Plot 

The book is divided into Part 1 and Part 2, being the equivalent of the two source novels. The chapter headings are the same as for the UK edition of those novels. 

In Part 1, Anthony Lyveden DSO, a destitute ex-officer, is forced to take a job as a footman at the Gramarye estate. The estate's owner, Colonel Winchester, becomes mad and leaves Lyveden in charge under a power of attorney. The situation drives Lyveden himself to madness.

In Part 2, Anthony Lyveden loses his memory, and confuses the two women who love him: Valerie French and André Strongi’th’arm.

Critical reception 

The book was published at a difficult time for Mercer, when relations between him and his wife Bettine were getting steadily worse. Nevertheless, the dedication read "To the American girl who did me the lasting honour to become my wife."

References

Bibliography
 

1929 British novels
Novels by Dornford Yates